Felipe Rojas Alou (born May 12, 1935) is a former Major League Baseball outfielder, first baseman, and manager. He managed the Montreal Expos (1992–2001) and the San Francisco Giants (2003–2006). The first Dominican to play regularly in the major leagues, he is the most prominent member of one of the sport's most notable families of the late 20th century: he was the oldest of the trio of baseball-playing brothers that included Matty and Jesús, who were both primarily outfielders, and his son Moisés was also primarily an outfielder; all but Jesús have been named All-Stars at least twice. His son Luis, in turn, managed the New York Mets.

During his 17-year career spent with the Giants, Milwaukee / Atlanta Braves, Oakland Athletics, New York Yankees, Montreal Expos, and Milwaukee Brewers, Alou played all three outfield positions regularly (736 games in right field, 483 in center, 433 in left), and led the National League twice in hits and once in runs. Batting regularly in the leadoff spot, he hit a home run to begin a game on 20 occasions. He later became the most successful manager in Expos history, leading the team from 1992 to 2001 before rejoining the Giants in 2003. On February 4, 2015, Alou was elected to the Canadian Baseball Hall of Fame, and in 2016, he was inducted in the Caribbean Baseball Hall of Fame. He is one of just three men to have 2,000 hits, 200 home runs, and 1,000 managerial wins (the other two are Joe Torre and Frank Robinson).

Early life
Alou lived in poverty in the Dominican Republic, but his parents dreamed of him escaping it by having him aim to be a doctor. He was proficient in sports from a young age, having run on the track team for the Dominican national team. He entered the University of Santo Domingo in 1954 as a premedical student. He played baseball in college team while getting ready for the 1955 Pan American Games (held in March), aiming for track. However, at the last minute, he was switched to the baseball roster. The Dominican team would win the gold. He planned to stay with his studies, but he attracted interest in baseball due to his university coach, who had served as a scout with the Giants. In November 1955, he signed with the New York Giants for $200 due to family financial problems.

Playing career
After a few years in the minors, Alou made his major league debut at the age of 23 on June 8, 1958. He went 2-for-3 while driving in a run. He played sparingly in his first three seasons, playing 276 total games (with 199 hits) in his first three combined seasons (primarily in the outfield while spending a bit of time pinch-hitting); he walked 52 times while striking out 114	times. Felipe was joined by his brother Matty in 1960. He played in 132 games for the 1961 squad and batted .289 while collecting 120 hits with eighteen home runs.

Felipe was joined by his brothers, Matty in 1960, and Jesús in 1963, who, on September 15 of that year became the first, and as of today only, all-brother outfield, playing in a game together simultaneously for the Giants.

1962 was his fifth season with the Giants. It would also be his first All-Star season along with the first time he would reach the postseason. He played 154 games while being named to the 1962 All-Star Game (first game); he batted .316 while slugging 25 home runs with 98 runs batted in (RBI)  The Giants won 101 games in the National League West division to force a 1962 National League tie-breaker series with the Los Angeles Dodgers (a best-of-three series counted as regular season games). In the ninth inning of the third game, the Giants trailed 4-2 with Ed Roebuck pitching. Matty Alou started the inning with a single, and Felipe later came to bat with two on base and one out. Alou would draw a walk on six pitches to load the bases. The next batter, Willie Mays, lined a shot through the pitcher for a run, before Orlando Cepeda drove in a run on a sacrifice fly to tie the game; Jim Davenport would draw a walk with the bases loaded again to score Alou as the third of four runs scored by the Giants in the inning on their way to a 6-2 victory. This meant the Giants had won their first NL pennant since 1954 and first since the move to San Francisco. Alou and his Giants were matched against the New York Yankees (winners of the last World Series).  In a seven game series, he batted .269 (collecting seven hits). However, it was the play that he did not make that "haunted" him. In Game 7, the Giants were trailing 1-0 in the bottom of the ninth inning with a batter on. Alou was instructed to bunt against pitcher Ralph Terry. However, the bunt moved foul on the first base line. He then hit a foul ball on a called hit-and-run play before striking out. This proved key on the final out of the game, when Willie Mays hit a two-out double before Willie McCovey committed the last out with batters on third and second; Alou was quoted as stating “You have to be ready to bunt in a World Series. I was not ready. I drove in 98 runs. I hit 25 home runs [including 15 at Candlestick Park], and Candlestick was big. I saw the bunt sign, and I had my doubts."

Despite playing with a handful of Latino players (such as Orlando Cepeda) on the Giants, manager Alvin Dark did not allow them to speak Spanish in the clubhouse, which displeased Alou, who noted it decades later in his memoirs; the two became friends after Alou retired because of their shared Christian faith. He also had a problem with what he felt was a lack of understanding that Major League Baseball had with its Latino players, stating “We have many friends in this country, our names are in the American papers, and we become well known to many Americans, but though we are in this country, we are not a part of this country. We are strangers.”

He was traded to the Braves before the 1964 season with Ed Bailey, Billy Hoeft and a player to be named later (Ernie Bowman) for Del Crandall, Bob Hendley and Bob Shaw. In 1966 Alou batted .327 with 31 home runs and led the league in runs (122), hits (218), at bats (666) and total bases (355); he finished second in the batting race to his brother Matty and fifth in National League MVP voting. In 1968  Alou batted .317 and leading the league in hits (210) and at bats (662); he made the All-Star team both years. While the Braves went to the 1969 National League Championship Series after winning the NL West, Alou appeared just once, doing so as a pinch hitter in Game 3. Facing Nolan Ryan, he lined out in the eighth inning for his last postseason appearance as a player.

After that season, the Braves traded Alou to the Athletics for Jim Nash. In April 1971, He was dealt from the Athletics to the Yankees for Rob Gardner and Ron Klimkowski on April 9, 1971.

He played in 131 games for the Yankees, batting .288 with 135 total hits and eight home runs. He played another two years with the Yankees (playing 120 games in 1972, 93 in 1973), ultimately hitting .271 with 289 combined hits in three years with the team. On September 6, 1973, he was selected off waivers by the Expos from the Yankees; he played nineteen games with the Expos, having ten hits. He was purchased by the Brewers from the Expos after the season. He played three games for the Brewers, striking out twice with no hits before being released on April 29.

In 2,082 games played over eighteen seasons, Alou compiled a .286 batting average (2101-for-7339) with 985 runs, 359 doubles, 49 triples, 206 home runs, 852 RBI, 423 base on balls, .328 on-base percentage and .433 slugging percentage. His career fielding percentage was .986 at all three outfield positions and first base.

Managing career

Overview

After the end of his playing career, Alou joined the Montreal Expos organization in 1976, becoming a batting coach and a minor league manager. The Giants offered him the manager's spot in 1985, but he remained with the Expos out of loyalty. On May 22, 1992, he was promoted from bench coach to field manager of the Expos, becoming the first Dominican-born manager in MLB history.

The team was developing a core of young talent during this period, including Larry Walker, John Wetteland, Delino DeShields and Alou's own son, Moisés. In 1994 the Expos had the best record in the major leagues until the mid-August strike that ended up cancelling the entire postseason, thereby denying them a chance to get to their first World Series, and ownership soon began dealing all their young talent to cut payroll. Alou was named the NL Manager of the Year. The Los Angeles Dodgers tried to lure him away in 1998, but he declined to leave Montreal and eventually became the most successful manager in team history.

Despite Alou's popularity in Montreal, the Expos' lackluster record after 1994 eventually led to his dismissal by new owner Jeffrey Loria, who replaced him with Jeff Torborg during the 2001 season. Several teams tried to lure him out of retirement, including the Boston Red Sox, but he would not budge. He finally agreed to serve a single year as the bench coach for Detroit Tigers rookie manager Luis Pujols (2002). Prior to the 2003 season, Alou was named manager of the Giants, the team where he began his professional baseball career, replacing Dusty Baker who had left to manage the Chicago Cubs. In his first season in San Francisco, he won a hundred games and managed the Giants into the playoffs, but they fell to the Florida Marlins in the NL Division Series in 4 games; the Marlins went on to win their second World Series in seven years.

In 2005, the Giants signed Moisés Alou to a one-year contract with an option for the 2006 season, reuniting him professionally with his father after seven seasons apart. On July 3, 2006, Alou won his 1,000th game as a manager, winning against the Colorado Rockies 9-6. He retired as Giants' manager after the 2006 season.  Since 2007, he has remained with the Giants organization as a special assistant to the general manager.

Managerial record

Personal life
Alou has been married four times, three of which ended in divorce. He met Lucie in 1985 and they reside in Florida. He continues to work in baseball. Alou has eleven children: Maria Rojas Beltre, Jose Alou (who died in a swimming accident at the age of 15), Moisés Alou, Christia Alou, Cheri Alou, Jennifer Alou, Felipe Rojas Brens, Luis Rojas, Valérie Alou, and Felipe Alou, Jr.

In 2018, he released a memoir, titled Alou: My Baseball Journey, which he cowrote with Peter Kerasotis.

See also

 Alou family
 List of Major League Baseball players from the Dominican Republic
 List of Major League Baseball career hits leaders
 List of Major League Baseball annual runs scored leaders
 List of second-generation Major League Baseball players
 List of Major League Baseball managers by wins

References

Notes

External links

 Retrosheet
 SABR BioProject
 Republic of Baseball: The Dominican Giants of the American Game Latino Public Broadcasting documentary on Alou, Juan Marichal, and Manny Mota

1935 births
Living people
Felipe
Atlanta Braves players
Baseball players at the 1955 Pan American Games
Canadian Baseball Hall of Fame inductees
Caribbean Series managers
Cocoa Indians players
Detroit Tigers coaches
Dominican Republic baseball coaches
Dominican Republic expatriate baseball players in Canada
Dominican Republic expatriate baseball players in the United States
Dominican Republic national baseball team players
Dominican Republic national baseball team managers
Dominican Republic people of Catalan descent
Indianapolis Indians managers
Lake Charles Giants players
Leones del Escogido players
Major League Baseball bench coaches
Major League Baseball center fielders
Major League Baseball first base coaches
Major League Baseball players from the Dominican Republic
Major League Baseball right fielders
Manager of the Year Award winners
Milwaukee Brewers players
Minneapolis Millers (baseball) players
Montreal Expos coaches
Montreal Expos managers
Montreal Expos players
National League All-Stars
New York Yankees players
Oakland Athletics players
Pan American Games gold medalists for the Dominican Republic
Pan American Games medalists in baseball
People from Bajos de Haina
Phoenix Giants players
San Francisco Giants managers
San Francisco Giants players
Springfield Giants players
Medalists at the 1955 Pan American Games